Disney's Escape to Witch Mountain, commonly referred to simply as Escape to Witch Mountain, is a 1995 American made-for-television fantasy-adventure film and a remake of the 1975 film of the same name. The film was announced by American Broadcasting Company (ABC) in September 1994, as the third of four Disney film remakes to air on the channel, the other three being The Shaggy Dog, The Computer Wore Tennis Shoes, and Freaky Friday. The film was produced by Walt Disney Television and premiered on ABC on April 29, 1995, as an ABC Family Movie.

Plot 
On the outskirts of a small town there is a rock formation called Witch Mountain rumored to possess mysterious powers. A young waitress, Zoe Moon (Perrey Reeves), witnesses infant twin children Anna and Danny appear behind the diner in a pillar of purple light, causing her to faint from shock. When a local hermit named Bruno (Brad Dourif) finds them in the bed of his truck, he moves Anna to the back of another nearby truck but is seen by Sheriff Bronson (Kevin Tighe) while carrying Danny and is told to freeze. The truck containing Anna drives away before she is noticed, separating the two.

Danny (Erik von Detten) spends the next nine years of his life between foster families and frequently runs away. After his latest attempt is thwarted, his frustrated social worker decides to leave him at an orphanage run by Lindsay Brown (Lynne Moody). He is reunited with Anna (Elisabeth Moss) when she saves him from Xander (Sam Horrigan), an older boy at the orphanage who has a soft spot for Anna. Neither Danny or Anna are initially aware of their relationship, despite performing identical odd mannerisms. However, their newly found proximity to one another reawakens their supernatural powers and they realize that they are siblings. When Edward Bolt (Robert Vaughn), a local magnate seeking to develop the nearby Witch Mountain, notices their powers, he decides to care for both of them as their foster father. Though Danny is happy with the development because he has his sister and a nice home, Anna is apprehensive about being adopted by Bolt and befriends Bolt's chauffeur, Luthor (Brad Dourif), who feels he has a connection to the twins.

During one of their outings to a purple general store, Anna uses her telekinetic abilities and catches the attention of the store's owner, Waldo Fudd (Vincent Schiavelli). Waldo reveals he has the same abilities they do and that they are extraterrestrials from another world where everyone has a twin. When they came to Earth to explore, everyone separated due to the quarrels they experienced on Earth. Waldo has been working to reunite them all and take them home. Meanwhile, Zoe sees the purple light from the front of the shop and recognizes it and confronts Waldo to discover the fate of the twins she saw years earlier. Though he dismisses her claims, Waldo leaves her clues regarding Anna and Danny's fates if she wishes to help them.

Bolt reveals his true intention to exploit the twins' power to blast open Witch Mountain without explosives in order to obtain its valuable rock material, despite Waldo's protest that the mountain must not be tampered with. Anna discovers the truth and telepathically warns Danny, only to be held hostage by Bolt so that Danny will do as he asks. The twins are rescued by Xander and escape to Waldo's shop on a horse that Danny communicates with to help them. Lindsay becomes suspicious of Bolt when he sends the police to retrieve the children from the shop.

Zoe and Bruno help Danny and Anna escape to Witch Mountain after the twins levitate Bruno's truck, while Bolt is arrested by Bronson after Luthor exposes Bolt's plot. At Witch Mountain, Waldo and the other reunited twins await Anna and Danny so they can all return home. The last set of twins arrive soon after—Bruno and Luthor. Using Waldo and his twin's power on their home world, all of the twins return home in pairs, with Anna and Danny going last to close the gate between their home world and Earth. Waldo casually comments that he will be waiting for the next group of tourists, while Anna and Danny float up into the purple smoke to Witch Mountain. Zoe narrates that Witch Mountain is not haunted but has light in it.

Cast 
 Elisabeth Moss as Anna
 Erik von Detten as Danny
 Perrey Reeves as Zoe Moon
 Robert Vaughn as Edward Bolt
 Lynne Moody as Lindsay Brown
 Sam Horrigan as Xander
 Lauren Tom as Claudia Ford
 Vincent Schiavelli as Waldo Fudd
 Henry Gibson as Ravetch
 Bobby Motown as Skeeto
 Kevin Tighe as Sheriff Bronson
 Brad Dourif as Bruno the Hermit, Luthor
 John Petlock as Butler
 Beth Colt as Woman officer
 Daniel Lavery as Mr. Flynn
 Jeffrey Lampert as Man on TV
 Ray Lykins as Deputy
 Jennifer & Marissa Bullock as Baby Anna
 Nikki & Sammi Allen as Baby Danny

See also 
 Escape to Witch Mountain, the original 1975 theatrical film
 Return from Witch Mountain, the 1978 theatrical sequel
 Beyond Witch Mountain, the 1982 television sequel
 Race to Witch Mountain, the 2009 Disney remake of the 1975 film
 Alexander Key, the author of Escape to Witch Mountain, the 1968 science fiction novel

References

External links 
 

1995 television films
1995 films
1995 fantasy films
1990s fantasy adventure films
American science fiction adventure films
1990s science fiction adventure films
1990s children's fantasy films
1990s children's adventure films
Remakes of American films
American fantasy adventure films
American children's fantasy films
American children's adventure films
Disney television films
Disney film remakes
Witch Mountain films
Films about telekinesis
Television remakes of films
Walt Disney anthology television series episodes
Witch Mountain (franchise)
1990s English-language films
1990s American films